Man and Beast is a 1917 American silent adventure film directed by Henry MacRae and starring Harry Clifton, Eileen Sedgwick and L.M. Wells.

Cast
 Harry Clifton as Carl von Haagen
 Eileen Sedgwick as Gretel von Haagen
 L.M. Wells as Mr.Townsend
 Mattie Witting as Mrs. Townsend 
 J. Parks Jones as Ned Townsend
 Kingsley Benedict as Eitel van Haagen

References

Bibliography
 Robert B. Connelly. The Silents: Silent Feature Films, 1910-36, Volume 40, Issue 2. December Press, 1998.

External links
 

1917 films
1917 adventure films
American silent feature films
American adventure films
American black-and-white films
Universal Pictures films
Films directed by Henry MacRae
1910s English-language films
1910s American films
Silent adventure films